Flashback is a 2021 French time travel comedy film written and directed by Caroline Vigneaux. It stars Vigneaux, Sophia Aram, Suzanne Clément, Lison Daniel, Gad Elmaleh, Lannick Gautry, Emy Letertre, Florent Peyre and Sylvie Testud. A cynical lawyer is forced to relive the past and learn lessons from history. The film was released on Prime Video on 11 November 2021.

Plot
Charlie Leroy is a self-centered, career-driven lawyer who succeeds in getting her client, an accused rapist, acquitted on the grounds that his accuser was wearing thong underwear at the time, which Charlie argues indicates that the sex was consensual. Charlie does this cynically, as she herself is wearing thong underwear that day. After celebrating her court victory, Charlie is given a ride by a magical taxi driver, Hubert, who causes her to travel through time to different moments in French history, as well as events in Charlie's own life and the life of her parents, so that she learns about the previous struggles of women to gain equality, and also gains a better understanding of her own mother's life and struggles. 

Events in which Charlie participates include:
 The trial of Joan of Arc in 1431, where Charlie, who is suspected of being in league with the devil due to her red underwear, is subjected to trial by water
 Her parents getting their first bank account (which will be controlled by her father) in 1964
 A brief encounter with a violent caveman in prehistoric times
 A romantic evening of conversation with George Sand in 1850
 A political meeting with Olympe de Gouges and Nicolas de Condorcet relating to the Declaration of the Rights of Women, in 1793
 Seeing her father acting abusively to a young Charlie and her mother, on the first observation of International Women's Day in France, in 1982
 Accidentally running over Pierre Curie on a wagon, then convincing Aristide Briand (who is then Minister of Education) to appoint Pierre's widow Marie Curie to the professorship he held, in 1906
 Meeting (and seducing) Napoleon Bonaparte as he is drafting language defining the roles of husband and wife that is subsequently included in the Napoleonic Code of 1804, in 1803
 Meeting her grandparents at a polling place during the first French elections allowing women to vote in 1945
 Witnessing the trial of Marie-Claire Chevalier in 1972, along with Simone de Beauvoir

Charlie is eventually brought back to the morning of the trial, where she relieves the day differently. Charlie surprises everyone by representing the rape victim instead of the accused, and the trial ends in a finding of guilt.

Cast

Production
In March 2021, it was announced Caroline Vigneaux, Sophia Aram, Suzanne Clément, Lison Daniel, Gad Elmaleh, Lannick Gautry, Emy Letertre, Florent Peyre and Sylvie Testud had joined the cast of the film, with Vigneaux directing from a screenplay she wrote, with Alain Goldman serving as a producer under his Légende Films banner, with Amazon Studios set to distribute. The film overtly references the 1993 time loop film Groundhog Day, Charlie's radio alarm clock announces "It is not Groundhog Day, it is National Women's day." 

Principal photography on the film began in February 2021.

Music
The following musical selections were used during the movie and listed in the closing credits.

 "Bitch" by Plastiscines
 "We Can Hide Out" by Ofenbach & Portugal. The Man
 "Girls Just Wanna Have Some" by Chromatics
 "You Want My Money" by Lilly Wood and the Prick
 "Evolution" by Aedan
 "Le temps" by Aedan
 "Beijos" by DJ Vadim feat. Heidi Vogel
 "Enola Gay" by Orchestral Manoeuvres in the Dark
 "Les filles de Camaret" (traditional)
 "J'ai vu le loup, le renard et la belette" (traditional)
 "Etude Op. 10, No. 3 (Tristesse)" by Frédéric Chopin
 "Lemon Incest" by Serge Gainsbourg and Charlotte Gainsbourg, with music based on Chopin's Étude Op. 10, No. 3
 "La Traviata" by Carine Chassol 
 "T'as le Look, Coco" by Laroche Valmont
 "Debout les femmes" by 39 Femmes 
 "Cheeky Vintage" by John Rowcroft
 "Flashback" by Aedan, Voix Fanny Koom & Fanny Nkake
 "Rimes féminines" by Juliette

Reception
Yves Jaeglé of Le Parisien gave it 3.5 out of 5, calling it "Feminism For Dummies" and a "slap in the face to sexism".

References

External links
 
 

2021 films
2021 comedy films
2021 directorial debut films
2021 science fiction films
2020s feminist films
2020s French films
2020s French-language films
2020s political comedy films
2020s science fiction comedy films
Amazon Prime Video original films
Amazon Studios films
Films about time travel
French feminist films
French science fiction comedy films